Philiodoron frater is a moth in the family Cossidae. It is found in Chile.

Adults are extremely similar to Philiodoron cinereum, but the genitalia show them to be distinct.

References

External Links 
Natural History Museum Lepidoptera generic names catalog

Moths described in 1957
Hypoptinae